The 25th Arabian Gulf Cup, known as Khaleeji  Zain 25 for sponsorship reasons, was the 25th edition of the biennial football competition for the eight members of the Arab Gulf Cup Football Federation. The tournament was hosted in Iraq for the first time since 1979, in the host city of Basra.

Hosts Iraq won their fourth title by beating Oman 3–2 after extra time in the final.

Teams

Draw
The eight teams were drawn into two groups of four, by selecting one team from each of the four ranked pots. For the draw, the teams were allocated to four pots based on the FIFA World Rankings of October 2022. Pot 1 contained the hosts Iraq and the holders Bahrain, who were assigned to A1 and A2 respectively.

Squads

Each team had to register a squad of 23 players, three of whom must be goalkeepers.

Venues

Officials

Referees
 Ma Ning
 Ali Sabah
 Abdullah Jamali
 Ahmed Al-Kaf
 Salman Falahi
 István Kovács
 Shukri Al-Hanfoush
 Adnan Al-Naqbi
 Ilgiz Tantashev

Assistant Referees
 Zhang Cheng
 Zhou Fei
 Rashid Abdi
 Rashad Al-Hakmani
 Ovidiu-Mihai Artene
 Vasile Marinescu
 Zahi Al-Shammari
 Khaled Ayed

Video Assistant Referees
 Fu Ming
 Mohanad Qasim
 Jérémie Pignard
 Rédouane Jiyed
 Abdullah Al-Marri
 Abdullah Al-Shehri
 Ahmed Darwish

Group stage

Group A

Group B

Knockout stage

Bracket

Semi-finals

Final

Winner

Goalscorers

Team statistics 
This table shows all team performance.

Prize money and awards

Prize money 

Source:

Player awards 
The following awards were given:

Broadcasters
Middle East

Rest of the world

Controversies 

 	
Ahead of the opening ceremony, a scuffle ensued in the VIP section of the Basra International Stadium. Sheikh Fahad al-Nasser, who represents Kuwait's emir, was unable to enter as a result, and the Kuwaiti delegation left the stadium soon after. The Iraqi representatives apologised for the incident.
	
A stampede outside Basra International Stadium, ahead of the final, killed between one and four people and injured at least 60 others, according to reports. The incident was said to have been caused by thousands of fans without tickets turning up to the match early while the gates were still closed. In the afternoon, Basra authorities said the situation was under control and that the crowds had moved away from the stadium, and the final match went underway as scheduled.

Sheikh Hamad Bin Khalifa Bin Ahmed Al-Thani, president of the Arab Gulf Cup Football Federation, praised the outstanding organization of the 25th Arabian Gulf Cup by hosts Iraq, calling it a big success.

See also 
 2023 WAFF Championship
 2022 EAFF E-1 Football Championship
 2023 SAFF Championship
 2022 AFF Championship
 2023 AFC Asian Cup

References

Arabian Gulf Cup
2023 in Asian football
International association football competitions hosted by Iraq
January 2023 sports events in Iraq
25th Arabian Gulf Cup